Rusi is a 1984 Indian Tamil-language film, starring Mohan and Swapna .

Cast
Mohan
Swapna
Srikanth

Soundtrack

Reception

References

1980 films
1984 films
1980s Tamil-language films